Grevillea obliquistigma is a species of flowering plant in the family Proteaceae and is endemic to the south-west of Western Australia. It is a spreading shrub with linear leaves, and conical to cylindrical clusters of creamy-white to yellowish cream-coloured flowers, sometimes tinged with pink.

Description
The edges of the leaves or lobes are rolled under, enclosing most of the lower surface.

Taxonomy
Grevillea obliquistigma was first formally described in 1943 by Charles Gardner in the Journal of the Royal Society of Western Australia from specimens he collected near Pindar. The specific epithet (obliquistigma) means "slanting stigma".

In 1994, Peter Olde and Neil Marriott described three subspecies of G. obliquistigma in The Grevillea Book, and the names are accepted by the Australian Plant Census:

Distribution and habitat
Subspecies cullenii grows in mallee near Laverton and Cosmo Newberry in the Avon Wheatbelt and Great Victoria Desert bioregions, subspecies funicularis in open shrubland between Morawa, Mingenew and Ballidu in the Avon Wheatbelt, Geraldton Sandplains and Yalgoo bioregions, and subsp. obliquistigma is widespread from the lower Murchison River to Mount Magnet and Bullfinch in the Avon Wheatbelt, Coolgardie, Geraldton Sandplains, Murchison and Yalgoo bioregions where it is found in open shrubland.

Conservation status
Subspecies funicularis and obliquistigma of G. obliquistigma are listed as "not threatened" but subsp. cullenii is listed as "Priority Three" by the Government of Western Australia Department of Biodiversity, Conservation and Attractions, meaning that it is poorly known and known from only a few locations but is not under imminent threat.

See also
 List of Grevillea species

References

obliquistigma
Proteales of Australia
Eudicots of Western Australia
Plants described in 1943
Taxa named by Charles Gardner